Saint Patroclus may refer to:

Patroclus of Bourges (496-576), Merovingian ascetic
Patroclus of Troyes (d. 259), wealthy native of Troyes, known for his charity

See also 
 St. Patrokli, Soest, Germany